Too Good to Be True may refer to:

Film, television, and theatre
 Too Good to Be True (film), a 1988 made-for-TV movie
 Too Good to Be True (Philippine TV series), an upcoming 2022 Philippine family drama romantic comedy television series
 Too Good to Be True, a scrapped spin-off of TV series Small Wonder
 Too Good to Be True, a 1601 play by Wentworth Smith, Henry Chettle and Richard Hathwaye

Music
 Too Good to Be True (album), a 2005 album by the Everly Brothers

Songs
 "Too Good to Be True" (Clay Boland song), 1936
 "Too Good to Be True" (Danny Avila and The Vamps song), 2018
 "Too Good to Be True" (Edens Edge song), 2012
 "Too Good to Be True" (Michael Peterson song), 1998
 "Too Good to Be True" by Motörhead from March ör Die, 1992
 "Too Good to Be True", a 1978 song by Tom Robinson Band
 "Too Good to Be True", a song by Tom Robinson Band on the 1978 album Power in the Darkness

See also
 Too Good (disambiguation)